The 2015–16 Segunda División B season was the 39th since its establishment. The first matches of the season were to be played in August 2015, and the season ended in June 2016 with the promotion play-off finals.

Overview before the season
80 teams will join the league, including four relegated from the 2014–15 Segunda División and 18 promoted from the 2014–15 Tercera División.

Relegated from Segunda División
Racing Santander
Recreativo
Sabadell
Barcelona B
Promoted from Tercera División

Algeciras
Arandina
Arenas Getxo
Atlético Levante
Ebro
Gernika
Izarra
Jumilla
Linares
Llosetense
Mensajero
Mérida
Pobla de Mafumet
Peña Sport
Pontevedra
Portugalete
Rayo Majadahonda
Talavera de la Reina

Groups

Group 1

Stadia and locations

League table

Results

Top goalscorers
Last updated 15 May 2016

Top goalkeepers
Last updated 15 May 2016

Group 2

Stadia and locations

League table

Results

Top goalscorers
Last updated 15 May 2016

Top goalkeepers
Last updated 15 May 2016

Group 3

Stadia and locations

League table

Results

Top goalscorers
Last updated 15 May 2016

Top goalkeepers
Last updated 15 May 2016

Group 4

Stadia and locations

League table

Results

Top goalscorers
Last updated 15 May 2016

Top goalkeepers
Last updated 15 May 2016

Attendance data
This is a list of attendance data of the teams that give an official number. It includes playoffs games:

Notes:
1: Team played last season in Segunda División.

See also
 2015–16 La Liga
 2015–16 Segunda División
 2015–16 Tercera División
 2015–16 Copa del Rey

References

External links
Royal Spanish Football Federation

 

 
2015-16
3
Spa